The Embassy of Colombia in Caracas is the diplomatic mission of the Republic of Colombia to the Bolivarian Republic of Venezuela; it is headed by the Ambassador of Colombia to Venezuela. It is located in the Campo Alegre neighbourhood of Caracas.

Duties
The Embassy is also accredited to the Co-operative Republic of Guyana, and the Republic of Suriname. The Embassy is charged with representing the interests of the President and Government of Colombia, improving diplomatic relations between Colombia and the accredited countries, promoting and improving the image and standing of Colombia in the accredited nations, promoting the Culture of Colombia, encouraging and facilitating tourism to and from Colombia, and ensuring the safety of Colombians abroad.

History 

After the 2002 Venezuelan coup d'état attempt Pedro Carmona, president of the Venezuelan Federation of Chambers of Commerce (FEDECAMARAS) who served briefly as interim President of Venezuela when Hugo Chávez was removed from power, was placed under house arrest, but he was able to gain asylum in the Colombian embassy after an anti-Chávez protest drew away his security detail.

During the 2008 Andean diplomatic crisis, on 3 March, Venezuela's foreign ministry released a statement announcing to expel Colombia's ambassador and all diplomatic staff at the Colombian embassy in Caracas.

See also
Colombia–Venezuela relations

References

External links
 

Caracas
Colombia
Colombia–Venezuela relations